Kekuiapoiwa Liliha was a queen of the island of Hawaiʻi.

Biography
She was a daughter of the High Chief Keōua and Kalola Pupuka-o-Honokawailani. She was a granddaughter of Keeaumoku Nui, Kamakaimoku, queen Kekuiapoiwa I and king Kekaulike.

Her siblings were Kalokuokamaile, great king Kamehameha I and Keliimaikai, Kalaimamahu, whom she later married and had two children, daughterKilioa and Son Keaniani whom the Kalaimamahu line was continued through.  She was an aunt of Kamehameha II, Kamehameha III and chiefess Kaohelelani.

She was also a half-sister of the king Kīwalaʻō. She married him and their daughter was Queen Keōpūolani, mother of Kamehameha II.

Kīwalaʻō was killed by the chief Keʻeaumoku Pāpaʻiahiahi.

References

Hawaiian royal consorts
House of Keawe
House of Līloa
Date of birth missing
Date of death missing
1815 deaths